The 2014 Swiss Figure Skating Championships took place between 5 and 7 December 2013 at the Patinoire des Mélèzes in La Chaux-de-Fonds. Skaters competed in the disciplines of men's singles, ladies' singles, pair skating, and ice dancing on the senior level. The results were used to choose the Swiss teams to the 2014 Winter Olympics, 2014 World Championships, and the 2014 European Championships.

Results

Men

Ladies

Pairs

Ice dance

External links
 2014 Swiss Championships results